Heinrich Simon Ludwig Friedrich Felix Rehm (20 October 1828, Ederheim – 1 April 1916, Munich)  was a German mycologist and lichenologist.
He studied at the Universities of Erlangen, Munich and Heidelberg, earning his medical doctorate in 1852. During his career, he was a practicing physician in Dietenhofen (from 1854), Sugenheim (from 1857) and Windsheim (from 1871). In 1875, he became regional medical examiner in Lohr am Main.

Publications (including published schedae ot his exsiccata series) 
Rehm, H. 1874. Ascomyceten Fasc. 5: 201-250
----. 1875. Ascomyceten 6: 251-300
----. 1881, publ. 1882. Beiträge zur Ascomyceten-Flora der Deutschen Alpen und Voralpen. Hedwigia 20: 97-103
----. 1882. Beiträge zur Ascomyceten-Flora der Deutschen Alpen und Voralpen. Hedwigia 21 (8): 113–123.
----. 1883. Ascomyceten Fasc. XV: 701-750
----. 1883. Ascomycetes Lojkani Lecti in Hungaria, Transilvania et Galicia. [i-iv], [1]-70. Berlin; Friedländer & Sohn
----. 1883. Ascomyceten fasc. XIV. Hedwigia 22: 52-61
----. 1885. Ascomyceten fasc. XVI. Hedwigia 24: 7-17
----. 1885. Ascomyceten fasc. XVII. Hedwigia 24 (6): 225-246
----. 1888. Ascomyceten 923, in sched.
----. 1888. Ascomyceten fasc. XIX. Hedwigia 27: 163-175
----. 1889. Ascomyceten: Hysteriaceen und Discomyceten. Dr L. Rabenhorst's Kryptogamen-Flora von Deutschland, Oesterreich und der Schweiz Zweite Auflage. Vol. 1. 3. Abth: Ascomyceten: Hysteriaceen und Discomyceten. 209-336
----. 1889. Ascomyceten, Fasc. XX. Hedwigia 5: 347-358

Eponyms
In 1861, the fungal genus Rehmia  was named after him by lichenologist August von Krempelhuber, it is now a synonym of Rhizocarpon. Other mycological genera that were named after him include; Rehmiella , Neorehmia  now Trichosphaerella, Rehmiellopsis  now Delphinella, Rehmiodothis , Discorehmia  and Rehmiomycella .

See also
 :Category:Taxa named by Heinrich Rehm

References

German mycologists
1828 births
1916 deaths
German lichenologists
People from Donau-Ries